The British Standards Institution (BSI) is the national standards body of the United Kingdom. BSI produces technical standards on a wide range of products and services and also supplies certification and standards-related services to businesses.

History

BSI was founded as the Engineering Standards Committee in London in 1901. It subsequently extended its standardization work and became the British Engineering Standards Association in 1918, adopting the name British Standards Institution in 1931 after receiving a Royal Charter in 1929. In 1998 a revision of the Charter enabled the organization to diversify and acquire other businesses, and the trading name was changed to BSI Group.

The Group now operates in 195 countries. The core business remains standards and standards related services, although the majority of the Group's revenue comes from management systems assessment and certification work.

In 2021, BSI appointed its first female chief executive officer, Susan Taylor Martin.

Activities

BSI produces British Standards, and, as the UK's National Standards Body, is also responsible for the UK publication, in English, of international and European standards. BSI is obliged to adopt and publish all European Standards as identical British Standards (prefixed BS EN) and to withdraw pre-existing British Standards that are in conflict. However, it has the option to adopt and publish international standards (prefixed BS ISO or BS IEC).

In response to commercial demands, BSI also produces commissioned standards products such as Publicly Available Specifications, (PASs), Private Standards and Business Information Publications. These products are commissioned by individual organizations and trade associations to meet their needs for standardized specifications, guidelines, codes of practice etc. Because they are not subject to the same consultation and consensus requirements as formal standards, the lead time is shorter.

BSI also publishes standards-related books, CD-ROMs, subscription and web-based products as well as providing training on standards-related issues.

Management systems assessment and certification

With 80,000 clients, BSI is one of the world's largest certification bodies. It audits and provides certification to companies worldwide who implement management systems standards. BSI also runs training courses that cover the implementation and auditing requirements of national and international management systems standards.

It is independently accredited and assesses a wide range of standards and other specifications including:

Testing Services and Healthcare

Within Testing Services, BSI's best known product in the UK is the Kitemark, a registered certification mark first used in 1903. The Kitemark – which is recognized by 82% of UK adults – signifies products or services which have been assessed and tested as meeting the requirements of the related specification or standard within a Kitemark scheme.

BSI also conducts testing of products for a range of certifications, including for CE marking. CE marking must be applied to a wide range of products intended for sale in the European Economic Area. Frequently manufacturers or importers need a third-party certification of their product from an accredited or 'Notified' body. BSI holds Notified Body status for 15 EU Directives, including construction products, marine equipment, pressurised equipment and personal protective equipment.

BSI also conducts testing for manufacturers developing new products and has facilities to test across a wide range of sectors, including construction, fire safety, electrical and electronic and engineering products.

Within Healthcare, BSI provides regulatory and quality management reviews and product certification for medical device manufacturers in Europe, the United States, Australia, Japan, Taiwan, Canada and China. It is the market leader in the US, the world's biggest healthcare market.

Milestones

 BSI is the world's first national standards body.
 BSI created one of the world's first quality marks in 1903, when the letters 'B' and 'S' (for British Standard) were combined with V (for verification) to produce the Kitemark logo.
 BSI was instrumental in the formation of ISO, the International Organization for Standardization, in 1947 and of its European equivalent, CEN, in 1961.
 BSI pioneered the development of management systems standards: the first of which was BS 5750, the original quality management systems standard which formed the template for the ISO 9000 series of quality standards, first published in 1994.
 BSI published the world's first environmental management standard, BS 7750, in 1992.  This led to the publication of the first international environmental management standard, ISO 14001, in 1996.  BSI also published the world's first sustainability standard, BS 8900, in 2006.
 BSI's management systems operation in the UK has been carbon neutral since 2006. BSI reduced staff's business travel by 200,000 miles per annum, and invested in carbon offsetting in the UK and Bulgaria.
 BSI has been nominated a Business Superbrand in the UK every year since 2004. BSI is currently ranked no. 42 out of 500 organizations.

Acquisitions
Starting in 1998, BSI Group has adopted a policy of international growth through acquisition as follows:

 1998: CEEM, USA and International Standards Certification Pte Ltd, Singapore
 2002: KPMG's certification business in North America
 2003: BSI Pacific Ltd, Hong Kong
 2004: KPMG's certification business in the Netherlands
 2006: Nis Zert, Germany; Entropy International Ltd, Canada & UK; Benchmark Certification Pty Ltd, Australia; ASI-QS, UK
 2009: Supply Chain Security Division of First Advantage Corp. USA; Certification International S.r.l, Italy; EUROCAT, Germany
 2010: GLCS, the leading certifier of gas related consumer equipment in the UK and one of the top three in Europe, the certification business of BS Services Italia S.r.l. (BSS); Systems Management Indonesia (SMI).
 2013: 9 May 2013 – NCS International and its daughter company NCSI Americas, Inc.
 2015: 24 January – EORM, a US consultancy specialising in environmental, health, safety (EHS) and sustainability services
 2015: 30 January – the management systems certification business of PwC in South Africa
 2015: 3 June – Hill County Environmental Inc, a US environmental and engineering services consultancy
 2016: 4 April – Espion Ltd and Espion UK, experts at managing and securing corporate information
 2016: 15 August – Atrium Environmental Health and Safety Services LLC, experts in occupational safety, industrial safety and environmental compliance
 2016: 22 September – Creative Environment Solutions (CES) Corp., an Environmental and Safety consulting firm
 2016: 4 October – Info-Assure Ltd, a leading provider of cyber security and information assurance
 2016: 15 December – Quantum Management Group Inc, a US environmental, health and safety (EHS) consultancy
 2017: 5 December – Neville Clarke, the Business Process Improvement Expert 
 2018: 8 November – AirCert GmbH, a specialist aerospace certification company located in Munich, Germany
 2019: 3 April – AppSec Consulting, a US cybersecurity and information resilience company
 2021: 1 February – Q-Audit, a JAS-ANZ accredited healthcare auditing body based in Sydney, Australia and Auckland, New Zealand.

BSI Identify
In 2021, BSI Group, supported by the Construction Products Association, led the development of a system known as BSI Identify, which has been established in response to Dame Judith Hackitt's recommendation that  BSI Identify uses new Digital Object Identifier (DOI) technology "to deliver a unique, constant, and interoperable identifier", known as a BSI UPIN, "which can be assigned to products to help UK manufacturers to directly manage information about their products in the supply chain". The aim of the BSI Identify programme is that "wherever you are with [a] product, you can take a snapshot of the QR code with your mobile device and it will immediately take you to the product technical data sheet. You can see exactly what product it is, you can answer any questions about it, you can see installation advice etc."

See also

Notes and references

External links
 
 BSI Group United Kingdom

 BSI Group
Certification marks
Companies based in the London Borough of Hounslow
Electrical safety standards organizations
Trade associations based in the United Kingdom
International Electrotechnical Commission
United Kingdom
Organizations established in 1901
Standards organisations in the United Kingdom
1901 establishments in the United Kingdom